Eleutherodactylus toa is a species of frog in the family Eleutherodactylidae endemic to Cuba.
Its natural habitats are subtropical or tropical moist lowland forest and rivers.
It is threatened by habitat loss.

References

toa
Endemic fauna of Cuba
Amphibians of Cuba
Amphibians described in 1991
Taxonomy articles created by Polbot